Chasing the Green is a 2009 American drama film directed by Russ Emanuel and starring Jeremy London, Ryan Hurst, Heather McComb, Dan Grimaldi, Robert Picardo and William Devane.

Cast
Jeremy London
Ryan Hurst
Heather McComb
William Devane
Robert Picardo
Patricia Rae
Dan Grimaldi
Larry Pine
Chris Gunn

References

External links
 
 
 

American sports drama films
2000s English-language films
2000s American films